Cetățuia may refer to several villages in Romania:

 Cetățuia, a village in Strugari Commune, Bacău County
 Cetățuia, a village in Bărbulețu Commune, Dâmbovița County
 Cetățuia, a village in Cioroiași Commune, Dolj County
 Cetățuia, a village in Vela Commune, Dolj County
 Cetățuia, a village in Găujani Commune, Giurgiu County
 Cetățuia, a village in Sânsimion Commune, Harghita County
 Cetățuia, a village in Puiești Commune, Vaslui County

and to:

 Cetățuia, a fortified hill in Cluj-Napoca
 Cetățuia, one of the Seven hills of Iași
 Cetățuia Monastery

See also 
 Cetate (disambiguation)
 Cetatea (disambiguation)
 Cetățuia River (disambiguation)